The 2010 Canadian Direct Insurance BC Men's Curling Championship (British Columbia's men's provincial curling championship) was held February 1–7 at the Vernon Curling Club in Vernon, British Columbia. The winning Jeff Richard team represented British Columbia at the 2010 Tim Hortons Brier in Halifax, Nova Scotia.

The teams that advanced to compete in the championships competed in either a coastal or interior championships, as part of the British Columbia Men's Curling Championship. These competitions hosted 16 regionally qualified teams in the hopes that they would make it into the Canadian Direct Insurance BC Men's Curling Championship. Only 4 berths advance to the next competition.

The 2010 championship was hosted by Kal-Tire.

Teams

Standings

Scores

February 1
Geall 6-3 Richard
Wakefield 6-4 Buchy
Tuson 6-4 Thomson
Gretzinger 8-6 Waatainen
Ursel 5-2 McAulay
Wakefield 8-5 Waatainen
Geall 9-3 Thomson
McAulay 9-7 Richard
Ursel 8-3 Tuson
Gretzinger 8-6 Buchy

February 2
Bushy 5-4 Tuson
Gretzinger 11-5 McAulay
Ursel 10-4 Geall
Richard 6-5 Wakefield
Thomson 8-6 Waatainen
Geall 9-5 McAulay
Wakefield 9-8 Tuson (11)
Waatainen 11-6 Buchy
Gretzinger 7-2 Thomson
Ursel 7-4 Richard

February 3
Ursel 6-2 Waatainen
Richard 9-1 Thomson
Gretzinger 6-3 Wakefield
Geall 10-8 Buchy (11)
Tuson 7-5 McAulay
Tuson 11-6 Gretzinger
Ursel 8-1 Buchy
Richard 7-6 Waatainen
McAulay 8-7 Thomson
Geall 11-3 Wakefield

February 4
Thomson 9-3 Buchy
Waatainen 7-5 McAulay
Geall 11-1 Tuson
Richard 5-2 Gretzinger
Wakefield 7-6 McAulay
Geall 7-3 Gretzinger
Ursel 9-3 Thomson
Richard 8-2 Buchy
Tuson 7-6 Waatainen

February 5
Ursel 7-4 Gretzinger
Richard 9-6 Tuson
Buchy 7-3 McAulay
Geall 8-7 Waatainen
Thomson 9-7 Wakefield

Playoffs

References

External links
Official site

Canadian Direct Insurance BC Men's Championship
Sport in Vernon, British Columbia
2010 in British Columbia
Curling in British Columbia
February 2010 sports events in Canada